Śāṇavāsa (Śānakavāsin, Sambhūta Śāṇavāsi or Sanakavasa) was a disciple of Ananda, and is considered the fourth Indian Patriarch in Zen Buddhism after Shakyamuni, Mahakashyapa and Ananda.

References

Further reading

Chan patriarchs
Zen patriarchs
Seon patriarchs
Indian Buddhist monks
Early Buddhism
Soto Zen